
Gmina Chojna is an urban-rural gmina (administrative district) in Gryfino County, West Pomeranian Voivodeship, in north-western Poland, on the German border.

The gmina contains part of the protected area called Cedynia Landscape Park.

Villages
Apart from the town of Chojna, Gmina Chojna contains the villages and settlements of Bara, Barnkowo, Białęgi, Boguszczyn, Brwice, Czartoryja, Drozdowo, Garnowo, Godków, Godków-Osiedle, Grabowo, Graniczna, Grzybno, Jelenin, Jelonki, Kaliska, Kamienny Jaz, Krajnik Dolny, Krajnik Górny, Krupin, Krzymów, Kuropatniki, Łaziszcze, Lisie Pola, Lisie Pole, Mętno, Mętno Małe, Narost, Nawodna, Ognica, Ostrów, Pniewko, Przyciesie, Raduń, Rurka, Stoki, Strzelczyn, Strzeszewko, Trzeszcze, Wilcze, Wilkoszyce and Zatoń Dolna.

Neighbouring gminas
Gmina Chojna is bordered by the gminas of Banie, Cedynia, Mieszkowice, Moryń, Trzcińsko-Zdrój and Widuchowa. It also borders Germany.

References
Polish official population figures 2006

Chojna
Gryfino County